Tiffany Dawn Thornton (born February 14, 1986) is an American former actress, radio personality and singer best known for her co-starring role as Tawni Hart on the Disney Channel Original Series, Sonny with a Chance and the spinoff, So Random!.

Career
Thornton made her television acting debut in the pilot episode of the Fox sitcom, Quintuplets. She then went on to appear in 8 Simple Rules, American Dreams, The O.C., Desperate Housewives, That's So Raven, Jericho, Wizards of Waverly Place and Hannah Montana.

In 2009, Thornton co-starred as Tawni Hart on the Disney Channel Original Series Sonny with a Chance and then went on to play a part in the Disney Channel Original Movie Hatching Pete. After Sonny with a Chance ended in early 2011, it was replaced by So Random! in the summer of 2011 and ended in 2012, where Thornton reprised her role as Tawni Hart.

From 2015 to 2016, Thornton was a radio personality for KLAZ 105.9 based in Hot Springs, Arkansas. She co-hosted the morning show "Kramer and Tiffany", as well as hosted her own mid-day show. She is also a blogger for DisneyBaby.com.

As of mid-2016, Thornton works as a recruitment advisor for Champion Christian College.

Personal life
Thornton was born in College Station, Texas. She is an alumna of Texas A&M University, where she sang the national anthem at a number of sporting events. She is a Christian.

In December 2009, Thornton became engaged to her boyfriend, Christopher Carney, a probation officer and former lead singer of the band The Prom Kings. The couple were married on November 12, 2011 at Garvan Woodland Gardens, in Hot Springs National Park in Hot Springs, Arkansas.

On February 13, 2012, Thornton announced that she was pregnant with their first child. On August 14, 2012, she gave birth to their first son. The child's godparents are actors Cassandra Scerbo and Wilmer Valderrama. On October 25, 2013, Thornton announced that she was pregnant with her second child. On March 1, 2014, she gave birth to their second son.  On December 4, 2015, Carney was killed in a car accident.

In January 2017, Thornton began a relationship with family friend and worship pastor Josiah Capaci. The couple announced their engagement on April 8, 2017. They were married on October 7, 2017. On April 11, 2018, the couple announced her pregnancy. On November 9, 2018, they had their first child together, a daughter. On December 6, 2020, the couple announced her pregnancy. On July 21, 2021, they had their second child together, a second daughter.

Filmography

Music

Songs

Music videos

References

External links

 
 

1986 births
Living people
21st-century American actresses
Actresses from Texas
American radio personalities
American television actresses
American voice actresses
American Christians
Texas A&M University alumni
People from College Station, Texas
Walt Disney Records artists
21st-century American singers
21st-century American women singers